Arisoa Lala Razafitrimo (born 26 April 1954) is a Malagasy politician who was Minister of Foreign Affairs of Madagascar from 2014 to 2015. She was educated at the University of Madagascar.

References

1954 births
Living people
Foreign Ministers of Madagascar
Female foreign ministers
Women government ministers of Madagascar
People from Toamasina
21st-century Malagasy women politicians
21st-century Malagasy politicians
Malagasy women diplomats